Agustín Politano de Pradal (born 24 November 1992) is an Argentine professional footballer who plays as a defender for Güemes.

Career
Politano began his career with Santamarina. He was selected for his professional debut in March 2013 by Gustavo Coleoni, who substituted the defender on after fifty minutes of a goalless draw with Sportivo Desamparados in Torneo Argentino A. Politano didn't appear in either of the next two seasons, though featured in fixtures with Estudiantes and Sportivo Belgrano in the 2015 Primera B Nacional campaign; with the match at home to Estudiantes being his professional bow. He featured more regularly in 2016, 2016–17 and 2017–18 when he made sixty-three appearances.

Career statistics
.

References

External links

1992 births
Living people
People from Tandil
Argentine footballers
Association football defenders
Torneo Argentino A players
Primera Nacional players
Club y Biblioteca Ramón Santamarina footballers
Sportspeople from Buenos Aires Province